Broscus is a genus of ground beetle native to the Palearctic, the Nearctic, the Near East and North Africa. It contains the following species:

Broscus aberti Jedlicka, 1965
Broscus asiaticus Ballion, 1871
Broscus augustulus Semenov, 1891
Broscus bipilifer Andrewes, 1927
Broscus canaliculatus Fischer von Waldheim, 1829
Broscus cephalotes (Linnaeus, 1758)
Broscus costatus Morvan, 1980
Broscus crassimargo Wollaston, 1865
Broscus declivis Semenov, 1889
Broscus glaber Brulle, 1836
Broscus insularis Piochard de la Brulerie, 1868
Broscus jaegeri J. Schmidt, 1996
Broscus karelini Zoubkoff, 1837
Broscus kozlovi Kryzhanovskij, 1995
Broscus laevigatus Dejean, 1828
Broscus nobilis Dejean, 1828
Broscus politus Dejean, 1828
Broscus potanini Semenov, 1889
Broscus przewalskii Semenov, 1889
Broscus punctatostriatus Fischer von Waldheim, 1829
Broscus punctatus Dejean, 1828
Broscus rutilans Wollaston, 1862
Broscus semistriatus Dejean, 1828
Broscus taurulus Andrewes, 1927
Broscus uhagoni Bolivar & Pieltain, 1912

References

External links
Broscus at Fauna Europaea

Broscinae
Beetles described in 1813
Carabidae genera